Stroller (1950–1986) was a  bay gelding who was the only pony to compete at the Olympics in show jumping.

He was a member of the British team who competed in the 1968 Olympics in Mexico, ridden by Marion Coakes. Bill Steinkraus and Snowbound won the Gold Medal while Marion and Stroller won the Individual Silver Medal, only four faults behind Steinkraus. Stroller jumped one of the only two clear rounds in the Olympic individual championship. In 1967, Marion rode Stroller to victory in the Hickstead Derby, the only pony to have ever won this event. This partnership won the Wills Hickstead Gold Medal, for points gained in the major events during the year, for five years consecutively from 1965 to 1970. Stroller was the grand age of 20 when he won the 1970 Hamburg Derby. The pair won 61 international competitions.

He was a crossbred horse, by a Thoroughbred sire out of a Connemara pony mare.  Stroller died of a heart attack at the high age 36 in 1986, after 15 years of happy retirement. He is buried at Barton-on-Sea Golf Club, New Milton, Hampshire, England.

Achievements
 Individual Silver medal at the 1968 Olympic Games (Mexico)
 Winner of the Women's Show Jumping World Championships 1965 (Hickstead) 
 Won 1967 Hickstead Derby
 Won 1970 Hamburg Derby (as only clear round) 
 Winner of the Queen Elizabeth II Cup 1965 and 1971 
 2nd place, Women's World Championships 1970 (Copenhagen)
 Only pony to compete at International level among horses and win consistently in Europe
 BHS (British Horse Society) Hall of Fame Laureate

References
Connemara Pony
Stroller profile in Horse & Hound

Show jumping horses
Individual Connemaras
Individual male horses
Horses in the Olympics
1950 animal births
1986 animal deaths